High Five is the second studio album from South Korean boy band Teen Top. The title track "Love Is" was debuted on April 10, 2017, with the album released both digitally and physically the same day.

Background
High Five marks the first album without L.Joe, who left Teen Top earlier that year due to contract controversies. The album was composed and written by Brave Brothers and Chakun, with contributions from Maboos, as well as members Changjo and Niel contributing their own songs.

Track listing

References 

Teen Top albums
2017 albums